Cruis'n is a racing game developed by Just Games Interactive and published by Midway Games for Wii. It is the fifth game in the eponymous series. The game was released on November 27, 2007, in North America, and was later released in Australasia on February 14, 2008, and in Europe on March 27.

Gameplay
It has similar gameplay to past titles in the Cruis'n series; players race down one-way courses consisting of streets (based on real-life locations) while avoiding various road hazards such as oncoming traffic and constructions.
Players can gain a limited temporary boost in speed by using nitrous oxide, otherwise known as N2O or simply Nitrous.

Cruis'n, like its arcade counterparts, allows players to customize and upgrade their cars' features, such as spoilers, decals, neon lights, ground effects, and engines, which they must purchase with money earned from races.

Cruis'n contains twelve courses which can be raced on four different difficulty levels.

Development
In 2006, Midway announced plans to port the arcade game The Fast and the Furious originally published by Raw Thrills to home consoles. The game's lead developer was Eugene Jarvis, who had overseen the development of the original Cruis'n arcade games while at Midway. Developers Just Games Interactive were hired to port the game for Wii. After being refused the F&F license (as the home console rights were already held by an unrelated game published by Namco Bandai) Midway decided to brand the game as part of the Cruis'n series, which they held the rights to.

Reception

Cruis'n fared poorly in reception. On review aggregators, the game had a positive score of 22.50% on GameRankings, and only 25 out of 100 positive reviews on Metacritic.

References

External links

2007 video games
Cruis'n
Racing video games
Street racing video games
Midway video games
Video games developed in the United States
Wii games
Wii-only games
Multiplayer and single-player video games
Kung Fu Factory games